The Tuirihiau Falls  is located  south of Thenzawl in Serchhip district in the Indian state of Mizoram.

The falls
Tuirihiau Falls Khawhthla or Tuirihiau Falls Falls is the most spectacular of all the waterfalls and cascades in the fast flowing rivers of Mizoram. It is located in Vanva river near Buangpui. The uniqueness of this waterfall is that there are caves behind the waterfalls and you see the falls from behind.

See also
List of waterfalls in India
List of waterfalls in India by height
Tourism in Mizoram

References 

Tourist attractions in Mizoram
Waterfalls of Mizoram